Nocardioides endophyticus is a Gram-positive, non-spore-forming, rod-shaped and non-motile bacterium from the genus Nocardioides.

References

External links
Type strain of Nocardioides endophyticus at BacDive -  the Bacterial Diversity Metadatabase

endophyticus
Bacteria described in 2013